Ocna Sibiului is a town in the centre of Sibiu County, in southern Transylvania, central Romania, 10 km to the north-west of the county capital Sibiu. The town administers a single village, Topârcea (Tschapertsch; Toporcsa).

At the 2011 census, 89.4% of inhabitants were Romanians and 9.7% Hungarians.

See also
 Castra of Ocna Sibiului
 Lacul Auster
 Ocna Sibiului mine

References

Image gallery

Populated places in Sibiu County
Localities in Transylvania
Spa towns in Romania
Towns in Romania
Mining communities in Romania